Santiago del Moro is an Argentine TV host. He has won the 2013 Tato award as best male TV host for his work in Infama.

Filmography
 Gran Hermano (season 11) (host - 2022)
 MasterChef Celebrity (seasons 1, 2, 3 & The Rematch) (host - from 2020)
 ¿Quién quiere ser millonario? (host - 2019)
 Escuela para suegras (host - 2017)
 Intratables (host - 2013–2018)
 Soñando por bailar (host - 2011–2012)
 Infama (host - 2008–2014)
 Lalola (As Matías - 2007–2008)
 Rock in TV (host - 2006–2007)
 Bendita (panelist - 2006–2007)
 Casados con hijos (As Agent Pettuto - 2006)
 El Refugio (As Marco Lenguizamón - 2006)
 Una Familia Especial (As Nicolás - 2005)
 22, el loco (As Juan - 2001)
 El Aguante (host - 1998–1999)

Awards
 2015 Martín Fierro Awards
 Best male host (for Intratables)

Nominations
 2013 Martín Fierro Awards
 Best male TV host (for Infama)

References

Argentine game show hosts
People from Buenos Aires
1978 births
Living people